Craig Sorger (February 10, 1990 — February 15, 2003) was a teenager from Ephrata, Washington who was murdered by his then-12-year-old friends Evan Drake Savoie and Jake Lee Eakin. Sorger, who was autistic, had been invited by the two boys to play in a park near his home. There, Savoie dropped a large rock on his neck, knocking him to the ground. He then repeatedly beat and stabbed him. Eakin joined in the attack, beating Sorger in the head and legs with a tree branch.

Savoie and Eakin were both charged with first-degree murder, despite maintaining their innocence. They were tried as adults, becoming some of the youngest murder defendants tried as adults in Washington state history. Eakin eventually confessed as part of a plea bargain and agreed to testify against Savoie. Eakin was sentenced to 14 years in prison. Savoie was initially sentenced to 26 years, which was reduced to 20 years after an appeal.

Murder 
Craig Sorger was an autistic teenager and a special education student from Ephrata, Washington, a small town of around 6,000 people. He was thirteen years old at the time of his murder.

On the afternoon of February 15, 2003, two twelve-year-old boys—Evan Savoie, of Ephrata, and Jake Eakin, of Moses Lake—stopped by the Sorger residence and asked Craig's mother if he could play with them. According to Craig's younger brother, the two boys had played with Craig several times in the past. Craig's mother allowed her son to go with the two boys, but told them that Craig could not play for long.

According to Eakin's later testimony, the three boys went to a nearby park. Savoie asked Sorger to feel the ground in order to see if it was wet. He instructed Sorger to touch the ground and count to ten. While Sorger was on his knees, Savoie dropped a rock "the size of a basketball" on his neck. He then began to repeatedly beat and stab Sorger. Eakin testified that he himself also beat Sorger in the head and legs using a fallen tree branch. With Sorger laying motionless on the ground, the two boys returned home.

As night fell, Sorger's mother began searching for Craig because he had not returned quickly as she had instructed. While searching, she visited Savoie's residence, where she found that Savoie and Eakin had already returned home, although Craig was no longer with them. She then called 9-1-1 and went to search the park, where she was joined by Savoie and his parents, and members of the Ephrata Police Department. A police officer soon discovered Sorger's dead body in a pile of leaves near a trail in the park.

When police questioned Savoie and Eakin that night, they claimed they had been climbing trees and playing tag in the park until around 4:30 pm, when they saw Sorger head home. They soon changed their stories and told police that they had seen Sorger fall from a tree. 

Police found no evidence that Sorger had fallen from a tree. The coroner also pointed out stab wounds on the body, most likely caused by a knife. Sorger's autopsy revealed that in addition to being beaten, he had been stabbed five times in the chest and torso and at least 34 times in the head and neck.

Trials
Although Savoie and Eakin both claimed innocence, they were charged with first-degree murder and tried as adults. In February 2005, The Washington Supreme Court upheld the decision to try the boys as adults by declining to hear the case. At twelve-years-old, they became the youngest murder defendants tried as adults in the state since 1931. Eakin confessed to his role in the killing in 2005, after spending 26 months in jail awaiting trial. He pleaded guilty to second-degree murder by complicity and agreed to testify as a witness against Savoie. Prosecutors agreed to request a relatively light sentence of eight years in prison in exchange for the guilty plea. Grant County Superior Court Judge Ken Jorgensen ruled that there were no mitigating factors to allow for such a sentence and instead gave Eakin a mid-range sentence of 14 years.

On April 29, 2006, Savoie was convicted of first-degree murder. He was sentenced to over 26 years in prison, the maximum sentence that could be imposed. In 2011, Savoie's conviction was overturned on appeal based on the trial judge's closure of parts of the trial to the public and his having appointed a lawyer for the victim's family who intervened in the trial. After prosecutors announced their intention to stage a second trial, Savoie pleaded guilty to second-degree murder. In March 2014, he was sentenced to 20 years in prison.

On June 12, 2016, Eakin escaped from work release while serving the final months of his sentence. He was recaptured by U.S. Marshals two days later in Rapid City, South Dakota. He was returned to custody and his sentence was extended due to his escape attempt. Eakin has since been released and is now an anti-abortion activist in Eastern Washington. Savoie was incarcerated in the Airway Heights Corrections Center, and released in June 2020. He married in October 2022.

See also
List of solved missing person cases

References

Further reading

External links 
60 Minutes II interview with Savoie and Eakin

2003 in Washington (state)
2003 murders in the United States
Deaths by beating in the United States
Deaths by person in Washington (state)
Deaths by stabbing in the United States
February 2003 events in the United States
Incidents of violence against boys
Male murder victims
Murder committed by minors
Murdered American children
People murdered in Washington (state)